Amblyptilia acanthadactyla, also known as the beautiful plume, is a moth of the family Pterophoroidea found in across the Palearctic including Europe. The species was first described by the German entomologist, Jacob Hübner in 1813.

Description
The moth flies almost year round with two generations, flying in July and from September to June (hibernating as an imago). They fly from dusk and the autumn moths have been found on ivy (Hedera helix). The imago of the beautiful plume is similar in appearance to the brindled plume (Amblyptilia punctidactyla) but is a warm reddish-brown (cf. darker appearing greyish-brown of the brindled plume, which also has distinct white speckling).
Examination of the genitalia is required for certain identification.

The larvae feed on various low growing plants, including, restharrow (Ononis spp.), hedge woundwort (Stachys sylvatica), cranesbills (Geranium species), cultivated geraniums (Pelargonium species), goosefoots (Chenopodium species), heathers (Calluna and Erica species), mints (Mentha species), sage (Salvia), wood sage (Teucrium scorodonia), lavender (Lavandula species), eyebright (Euphrasia species), carline thistles (Carlina species), Vaccinium species, calamints (Calamintha species) and catnip (Nepeta species).

Distribution
The beautiful plume is found in Europe and is also known from Iran and Georgia.

References

External links
 Lepidoptera of Belgium
 Microlepidoptera.nl 

Amblyptilia
Moths described in 1813
Moths of Asia
Moths of Europe
Taxa named by Jacob Hübner